James Francis Aloysius McIntyre (June 25, 1886 – July 16, 1979) was an American prelate of the Roman Catholic Church. He served as Archbishop of Los Angeles from 1948 to 1970, and was created a cardinal in 1953. He was a highly successful builder of new parishes, churches, and schools. He was notable in Church politics, and his reputation remains highly controversial.

Early life
James McIntyre was born in Manhattan to James and Mary (née Pelly) McIntyre. His father was a native of New York City and member of the mounted police, and his mother was from Kiltormer, County Galway, Ireland. McIntyre attended Public School No. 70 because there was no room for him at the local parochial school.

His father was rendered an invalid after falling from his horse in Central Park and sustaining serious injuries; his mother then opened a dressmaking business to support the family. Following his mother's death in 1896, McIntyre and his father were taken into the nearby home of a relative. He did not attend high school, instead becoming an errand boy in the financial market. He attended night school at Columbia University and City College.

At age 16, McIntyre became a runner on the New York Stock Exchange, working for the brokerage firm of H.L. Horton & Co. He was offered a junior partnership at Horton in 1914, but declined in order to pursue Holy Orders. He then studied at Cathedral College for a year before entering St. Joseph's Seminary in Yonkers where he was a friend of Patrick O'Boyle.

Priesthood
McIntyre was ordained to the priesthood by Archbishop Patrick Hayes on May 21, 1921. He then served as assistant pastor of St. Gabriel's Church in the Lower East Side until 1923, whence he became assistant chancellor for the Archdiocese of New York. He was promoted to chancellor in 1934, and named Privy Chamberlain of His Holiness, Pius XI on December 27 of that year. Appointed a Domestic Prelate by Pope Pius XI on November 12, 1936.

Following the appointment of Francis Spellman to Archbishop of New York in 1939, McIntyre was named to the archdiocesan board of consultors. In 1939, he formed the Columbiettes, a Knights of Columbus women's auxiliary.

Episcopate

New York
On November 16, 1940, McIntyre was appointed auxiliary bishop of New York and titular bishop of Cyrene by Pope Pius XII. He received his episcopal consecration on January 8, 1941, from Archbishop Spellman, with Stephen Donahue and John O'Hara serving as co-consecrators, in St. Patrick's Cathedral. He became vicar general of the archdiocese on January 27, 1945, and received the Grand Cross of the Order of the Holy Sepulchre in May 1946. He once said that accounts of anti-Semitism in New York were "a manufactured movement...for the deliberate purpose of besmirching the minority Catholic population."

On July 20, 1946, McIntyre was named coadjutor bishop of New York and titular archbishop of Paltus. Despite never succeeding Spellman as archbishop, he assisted in the governance of the archdiocese while Spellman was busied by his additional duties as Apostolic Vicar for the Military Forces. Spellman once said, "I have never undertaken any important matter without consulting [McIntyre]. In nothing have I gone contrary to his advice." In 1947, McIntyre spoke out against legislation that would "permit further encroachments on the parental function of education."

Los Angeles
McIntyre was appointed the second archbishop of Los Angeles, California, on February 7, 1948. Replacing the late John J. Cantwell, he was installed at St. Vibiana's Cathedral on the following March 19. In McIntyre's first four years alone, 26 new parishes, 64 parochial schools, and 18 high schools were established. At one point during his tenure, he oversaw the construction of a new church every 66 days and a new school every 26 days to accommodate the post-World War II population boom. As archbishop, he led the successful effort to repeal the state tax on Catholic schools. In 1967 he consulted with California Governor Ronald Reagan regarding a proposed law to legalize abortion. He convinced Reagan to veto the law if it allowed abortions in case of birth defects. The legislature dropped that provision and Reagan signed the law, which decriminalized abortions when done to protect the health of the mother.

Pius XII created him Cardinal Priest of Santa Anastasia in the consistory of January 12, 1953. McIntyre was the first cardinal of the Western United States. At the consistory, when the official photographer's flash bulb failed to go off when the biretta was conferred, Pius and McIntyre re-enacted the ceremony. McIntyre was also one of the cardinal electors who participated in the 1958 papal conclave, and again in the 1963 papal conclave.

He sent his priests to meetings of the right-wing John Birch Society to educate themselves about communism, and recommended subscriptions to American Opinion and other Birch publications in his diocesan newspaper. He expressed caution towards "an obvious trend toward laxity" in the morality of films, and was one of the American bishops to oppose the liturgical revision of the Second Vatican Council, in which he participated from 1962 to 1965.

Cardinal McIntyre resisted elements in the church who dissented from Church dogma. He suspended Father William DuBay, who had called for McIntyre's removal in 1964 for not sufficiently supporting the civil rights movement, after DuBay advocated a labor union for Catholic priests and published a book critical of the Catholic Church hierarchy. When Bishop James P. Shannon expressed views critical of the Church hierarchy in an NBC documentary in the late 1960s, McIntyre described Shannon's views as constituting "incipient schism."

He had a dispute with the Sisters of the Immaculate Heart of Mary, whom he barred from teaching within the archdiocese in 1967 for their leftist tendencies and abandonment of their traditional discipline—such as eliminating the habit and compulsory daily prayer. The dispute was appealed to the Holy See, which stipulated that the sisters must either restore their former practices or request dispensation from their vows; 315 of the 380 members sought dispensation and formed a non-Catholic organization.

At the end of his tenure, he was the subject of protests by blacks, Hispanics, and his own clergy. John Cooney writes that McIntyre harbored racial prejudices and was approached privately by the priests of his archdiocese who asked him to refrain from making racial slurs.

He retired after 21 years as Archbishop on January 21, 1970, and then served as a parish priest at St. Basil's Church in Downtown Los Angeles, where he privately celebrated the Tridentine Mass on the side altars of St. Basil's.

McIntyre died at St. Vincent Medical Center in Los Angeles, at the age of 93. In 2003, his remains were transferred to the crypt of the new Cathedral of Our Lady of the Angels.

Reputation
McIntyre was disliked by liberal elements within the American Church. Charles Morris in his book American Catholic states:Today, McIntyre's name is associated mostly with his sad, slightly ridiculous octogenarian flailing against the cultural and religious revolutions of the 1960s. But if he had retired at the canonical age of 75 in 1961...he would be remembered as one of the great builders of the American Church.Monsignor Francis Weber, in his two-volume biography of McIntyre, tries to rehabilitate the cardinal's reputation. In a review of Weber's book, historian Kevin Starr agrees with Weber and articulates the alternative version of McIntyre and the 1960s. Starr writes:Sadly, this kindly (most of the time) and, in his own way, holy prelate became the scapegoat for those pushing the ecclesial revolutions, so frequently self-destructive, of the 1960s after the Second Vatican Council.

References

Further reading
 Burns, Jeffrey M. "Postconciliar Church as Unfamiliar Sky: The Episcopal Styles of Cardinal James F. McIntyre and Archbishop Joseph T. McGucken." US Catholic Historian 17.4 (1999): 64-82 online.
 Caspary, Anita Marie. Witness to integrity: The Crisis of the Immaculate Heart Community of California (Liturgical Press, 2003).
 Davis, Mike. City of Quartz: Excavating the Future in Los Angeles (1990, 2006) pp 323–72.
 Day, Dorothy. "The Case of Cardinal McIntyre.”." The Catholic Worker (1964). online
 Lynch, Thomas A. "Dorothy Day & Cardinal McIntyre: Not Poles Apart." Church (Summer 1992) (1992): 10–15.
 Donovan, John T. "The 1960s Los Angeles Seminary Crisis." Catholic Historical Review 102.1 (2016): 69–96. summary
 DuBay, William H. The Priest and the Cardinal: Race and Rebellion in 1960s Los Angeles (CreateSpace, 2016).
 Lothrop, Gloria Ricci. "A Remarkable Legacy: The Story of Secondary Schools in the Archdiocese of Los Angeles." Catholic Historical Review 88.4 (2002): 809–810.
 Real, James. "Immaculate Heart of Hollywood." Change: The Magazine of Higher Learning 3.3 (1971): 48–53.
 Steidl, Jason. "The Unlikely Conversion of Father Juan Romero: Chicano Activism and Suburban Los Angeles Catholicism." US Catholic Historian 37.4 (2019): 29–52.
 Weber, Francis J. His Eminence of Los Angeles: James Francis Cardinal McIntyre (Mission Hills, Calif.: Saint Francis Historical Society, 1997).

Primary sources
 Sister Mary Rose Cunningham, C.S.C., ed. Calendar of Documents and Related Historical Materials in the Archival Center, Archdiocese of Los Angeles, for the Most Reverend J. Francis A. McIntyre, Volume One: 1948-1960 and Volume Two: 1961-1970 (1995)

External links
Cardinals of the Holy Roman Church

Cardinals created by Pope Pius XII
20th-century American cardinals
Columbia University alumni
City College of New York alumni
Saint Joseph's Seminary (Dunwoodie) alumni
Roman Catholic archbishops of Los Angeles
American Roman Catholic clergy of Irish descent
1886 births
1979 deaths
Participants in the Second Vatican Council
Burials at the Cathedral of Our Lady of the Angels
Members of the Order of the Holy Sepulchre